Delvin Lamar Hughley (born April 18, 1978) is a former American football defensive back for the Baltimore Ravens and Denver Broncos of the National Football League. Hughley also spent time in the Arena Football League with the Colorado Crush. He played college football at Jacksonville State University where he was an All-American.

Early years
Hughley attended Anniston High School in Anniston, Alabama and was a letterman in football, basketball, track, and tennis. He only played high school football as a senior, and was an All-County selection and an All-State Honorable Mention selection. Hughley enrolled at Jacksonville State University where he became a 4-year starter and All-American Defensive Back. Hughley signed as an undrafted free agent with the Baltimore Ravens in 2001.

External links
Just Sports Stats
Career NFL transactions

1978 births
Living people
Players of American football from Alabama
American football defensive backs
African-American players of American football
Jacksonville State Gamecocks football players
Colorado Crush players
Indiana Firebirds players
Sportspeople from Anniston, Alabama
21st-century African-American sportspeople
20th-century African-American sportspeople